"On a Carousel" is a song written by Allan Clarke, Graham Nash and Tony Hicks. It was released by the Hollies as a single in February 1967, having been recorded the previous month, on the Parlophone label in the UK and Imperial in the US. Nash would opine: "'On a Carousel' was one of the Hollies' best songs. It's a pop song with an infectious chorus, but flirts with gorgeous shifts in rhythmic texture [that keep] the melody from becoming predictable. And the lyric captures the essence of young love without the usual moon-and-June cliches. We knew it was a hit from the get-go."

Original recording
Nash would recall that prior to "On a Carousel", "our biggest hits were Graham Gouldman songs ... Tony, Allan and I wanted desperately to write a monster A-side ... We thought we were good enough writers, we knew the combination, how to come up with a universal theme, the right kind of hook. So we went through a shitload of ideas until inspiration struck. I'm not sure which of the three of us came up with funfairs ... We [realized] a love affair was pretty much like going round and round and round on a carousel. And before we knew it the song just took shape. It was all there, the words, the tune, there was no stopping it. And Tony and Bobby [Elliott] wrapped it up in an exceptional arrangement."

"On a Carousel" was the Hollies first A-side on which Graham Nash sang lead vocals, although only for the first few lines. It was the Hollies' second-last single to be released in the US by Imperial before the band switched to the Epic label. The song was a hit in the UK, peaking at #4 on the single charts, and in Canada it made #7 in the RPM Magazine charts. It was also a hit in the United States, peaking at #11 on the Billboard chart.

Charts

Other versions

Mike Vickers, formerly a member of Manfred Mann, recorded the song for his 1968 debut album, I Wish I Were a Group Again.
Progressive rock band Glass Moon covered the song in 1982 on their second studio album Growing in the Dark.
American rock duo Shaw Blades recorded a version in 2007 for their covers album Influence.

References

1967 songs
The Hollies songs
Parlophone singles
Songs written by Graham Nash
Songs written by Allan Clarke (singer)
Songs written by Tony Hicks